Amiloxate is a sunscreening agent.  It is approved for use in the European Union and is undergoing regulatory evaluation in the United States.

See also
 Octyl methoxycinnamate

References

Sunscreening agents
Cinnamate esters
Ethers